Namibia competed in the 2003 All-Africa Games held at the National Stadium in the city of Abuja. It was the fourth time that the country had sent a team to the Games since gaining independence and the team left with seven medals. Amongst the medal winners was Frank Fredericks, who gained silver in the men's 200 metres.

Competitors
Namibia sent a substantial team to the Games and entered thirty six sports, of which fourteen were for men and twenty two for women. Amongst the competitors was Frank Fredericks who was given treatment usually limited to superstars. Contemporary media quoted him saying that he was in Abuja "to win and to have fun." He finished the competition with a silver medal.

Medal summary
Namibia won seven medals in total and came 22nd in the medal table. The team won no gold medals and the total was nearly half the total of the country’s debut at the 1991 Games and more than double the number at the following 2007 Games.

Medal table

List of Medalists

Silver Medal

Bronze Medal

See also
 Namibia at the African Games

References

2003 in Namibian sport
2003